Fernando Niño may refer to:
Fernando Niño de Guevara (1541–1609), Spanish cardinal
Fernando Niño (patriarch) (died 1552), Spanish prelate
Fernando Niño (footballer, born 1974), Spanish former footballer
Fernando Niño (footballer, born 2000), Spanish footballer